Sathyan Anthikad(3 January 1955) is an Indian film director, screenwriter, and lyricist who predominantly works in Malayalam cinema. In a career spanning five decades he has directed more than 50 films, been the lyricist for 12 films and been the scriptwriter for 6 films. He is the recipient of several accolades including a National Film Award, five Kerala State Film Awards and three Filmfare Awards. He received the Kerala Sahitya Akademi Award for Humour in 2019 for his book, Eeswaran Mathram Sakshi.

Films like Pingami though a commercial failure at the time release, have over the years gained a cult following.

Personal life
Sathyan Anthikad was born to M. V. Krishnan and M. K. Kalyani at Anthikad in Thrissur district of Kerala state. He is married to Nimmi Sathyan and has three sons, Arun, Anoop and Akhil.

Career
In 1973, Sathyan debuted as an assistant director to Dr. Balakrishnan in Rekha Cine Arts. He was the Associate Director of director P. Chandrakumar for more than twenty films till 1982. He also assisted director Jeassy in few films. Sathyan kickstarted his film direction with Kurukkante Kalyanam in 1982. Due to some unfortunate series of events this movie was never completed. He teamed up with Sreenivasan and made some Malayalam films, with Sreenivasan as the screenwriter. Thalayanamanthram, Nadodikkattu and Sandesam are some of the films born from this team. Sathyan made two novels into films: Appunni starring Mohanlal (a film adaptation of V. K. N.'s novel) and Irattakkuttikalude Achan starring Jayaram and Manju Warrier (an adaptation of C. V. Balakrishnan's novel).

Books
Sathyan Anthikad has authored Eeswaran Mathram Sakshi, Shesham Vellithirayil and Aathmaavinte Adikkurippukal. Eeswaran Mathram Sakshi received the Kerala Sahitya Akademi Award for Humour in 2019.

Public image
Sathyan Anthikad appreciated Varisu film for being high on emotions.

Filmography

Awards

References

External links
 Sathyan Anthikkad in MMDb
 
 Weblokam articles by Sathyan Anthikkad

Living people
People from Thrissur district
Malayalam film directors
Kerala State Film Award winners
Malayalam screenwriters
Filmfare Awards South winners
Writers from Thrissur
Film directors from Thrissur
20th-century Indian film directors
21st-century Indian film directors
20th-century Indian dramatists and playwrights
21st-century Indian dramatists and playwrights
Screenwriters from Kerala
Year of birth missing (living people)
Male actors in Malayalam cinema